André Rouillé ( fr. André Rouillé, born in 1948 in France) – historian and theorist of photography, professor at University Paris 8, author of a significant number of books on photography and contemporary art, founder and editor-in-chief of www.paris-art.com, the first French website devoted to contemporary culture.

Biography

In 1980 André Rouillé (being a math professor by that time) got a doctoral degree in historical sciences in University of Franche-Comté. His research changed a picture of genesis of photography. Later he wrote two books based on his thesis: L'Empire de la photographie, 1839-1870 and La Photographie en France, 1816-1871. Textes et controverses.

In  1986 -  1997 Rouillé was editor-in-chief in famous La recherche photographique ("Photography Review").

In 2002 he created Paris-Art, website devoted to contemporary culture including art, photography, design, dance and literature.

André Rouillé is a professor at Université Paris 8, he is a head of photography department and in charge of MA program "Photography and Contemporary Art' and PhD program "Plastic arts: Photography".

Bibliography

Sources
 Paris-Art website
 University Paris 8 
 Department of photography at Paris 8
 Bibliography of André Rouillé

References

:fr:André Rouillé

1948 births
20th-century French historians
Living people
Historians of photography
French male non-fiction writers
21st-century French historians
Academic staff of the University of Paris